Up the Ladder of Gold is a 1931 thriller novel by the British writer E. Phillips Oppenheim. He dedicated the work to the comedy writer P.G. Wodehouse. It represented the apex of Oppenheim's portrayal of the great man as a dynamic force.

Synopsis
An American investor Warren Brand attempts to corner the world market in gold in order to try and force the Great Powers to end any future prospect of war.

References

Bibliography
 Herbert, Rosemary. Whodunit?: A Who's Who in Crime & Mystery Writing. Oxford University Press, 2003.
 Magill, Frank Northen . Critical Survey of Mystery and Detective Fiction: Authors, Volume 3. Salem Press, 1988.
 Panek, LeRoy. The Special Branch: The British Spy Novel, 1890-1980. Popular Press, 1981.
 Reilly, John M. Twentieth Century Crime & Mystery Writers. Springer, 2015.

1931 British novels
Novels by E. Phillips Oppenheim
British thriller novels
Hodder & Stoughton books
Novels set in London